Elections to Wigan Council were held on 3 May 2007 with one third of the seats up for election.

Election result

This result had the following consequences for the total number of seats on the Council after the elections:

Ward results

By-elections between 2007 and 2008

References

2007 English local elections
2007
2000s in Greater Manchester